This is a list of aircraft manufacturers sorted alphabetically by International Civil Aviation Organization (ICAO)/common name. It contains the ICAO/common name, manufacturer's name(s), country and other data, with the known years of operation in parentheses.

The ICAO names are listed in bold. Having an ICAO name does not mean that a manufacturer is still in operation today, just that some of the aircraft produced by that manufacturer are still flying.

Q
Quad City, Quad City Ultralight Aircraft Corp – United States
Quasar, Dolní Bečva, Czech Republic
Quercy, Centre National Quercy-Rouergue RSA – France
Quest, Quest Aircraft Company LLC – United States
Questair, Questair, Inc. – United States
Quickie, Quickie Aircraft Corporation – United States
Quickie, Quickie Enterprises, Inc. – United States
Quikkit, Quikkit Corporation – United States
Quikkit, Quikkit Division of Rainbow Flyers, Inc. – United States
Quikkit, Quikkit, Inc. – United States
Qantas, Qantas, Inc. Australia

R
R & B, R & B Aircraft Company – United States
RACA, Representaciones Aero Comerciales Argentinas SA – Argentina
Radab, AB Radab – Sweden
Radiant Power Corp., Radiant Power Corp. – A Heico Company – United States
RAF (1), Royal Aircraft Factory – United Kingdom, > Royal Aircraft Establishment
Rad Aviation, Kidlington, United Kingdom
Ragwing, RagWing Aircraft Designs – United States
Rainbow, Rainbow Aircraft (Pty), Ltd. – South Africa
Rand, Kenneth Rand – United States
Rand, Rand Robinson Engineering, Inc. – United States
Ranger Aircraft Corp. – United States (1929, Oklahoma City OK, upon acquiring design and production rights of Coffman Monoplanes Inc.)
Rans, Rans, Inc. – United States (Randy Schlitter, Hays KS) kit-built small aircraft
Raven Rotorcraft, Boulder Colorado and later El Prado, New Mexico, United States
Ravin, SA Ravin Composite Aircraft Manufacturers – South Africa
Raytheon, Raytheon Aircraft Company – United States
Raytheon, Raytheon Corporate Jets, Inc. – United Kingdom
Rearwin, Rearwin Aircraft & Engines, Inc. – United States
Rearwin, Rearwin Airplanes, Inc. – United States
Reda, Reda-MDT, Ltd. – Russia
Redback Aviation, Hoppers Crossing, Victoria, Australia
Redfern, Walter Redfern Company – United States
Reflex, Reflex Fiberglass Works, Inc. – United States
Reflex Paramoteur, Chatou, France
Regio Aviasi Industri, PT. Regio Aviasi Industri - Indonesia
Regy Freres, Regy Freres – France
Reims, Reims Aviation SA – France
Renaissance (1), Renaissance Composites, Inc. – United States
Renaissance (2), Renaissance Aircraft LLC – United States
Renard, Robert Renard – France
Renard, George & Alfred Renard
Replica Plans, Replica Plans – Canada
Republic, Republic Aviation Corporation – United States, (1939–?)
Revolution, Revolution Helicopter Corporation, Inc. – United States
Rhein, Rhein-Flugzeugbau GmbH – Germany, (RFB)
Rhein-West-Flug, Rhein-West-Flug Fischer und Companie – Germany
Rihn, Dan Rihn – United States
Rihn, Rihn Aircraft Corporation – United States
Rikugun, Rikugun Kokugijutsu Kenkyujo – Japan, (Army Aerotechnical Research Institute)
Riley, Riley Aeronautics Corporation – United States, (?-1983) > Advanced Aircraft Corp
Riley, Riley Aircraft Corporation – United States
Riley, Riley Aircraft Manufacturing, Inc. – United States
Riley, Riley International Corporation – United States
Riley, Riley Turbostream Corporation – United States
RLU, Charles B. Roloff, Robert Liposky and Carl Unger – United States
Robin, Avions Pierre Robin – France, (1969–present)
Robin, Avions Pierre Robin, Inc. – Canada
Robin, Robin Aviation – France
Robinson, Robinson Helicopter Company – United States
Rock, J. Rock Segelflugzeugbau – Germany
Rocket, Rocket Aircraft Company – United States
Rockwell, Rockwell International Corporation – United States, (1966–1996) > Boeing North American
Rockwell-MBB, see ROCKWELL and MBB – United States/Germany
Rogerson Hiller, Rogerson Hiller Corporation – United States
Rogozarski, P. S. F. A. -Rogozarski – Yugoslavia, (1924–1941) (First Serbian Aircraft Factory-Rogozarski)
Rokospol Aviation, Prague, Czech Republic
Rolladen-Schneider, Rolladen-Schneider Flugzeugbau GmbH – Germany
Rollason, Rollason Aircraft and Engines, Ltd. – United Kingdom
Roll Flight, Schwelm, Germany
Romaero, SC Romaero SA – Romania
Rose, Rose Aeroplane and Motor Company – United States
Rotary Air Force, Rotary Air Force, Inc. – Canada
Rotec, Rotec Engineering, Inc. – United States
Rotor Flight Dynamics,  Wimauma, Florida, United States
Rotortec GmbH, Görisried, Allgäu, Germany
RotorWay International, Chandler, Arizona, United States
Rotorwing-Aero, Salt Lake City, Utah, United States
Rouchaud, F. Rouchaud, Construction Aéronautique – France
Rousseau, Etablissements Rousseau Aéronautique – France
RTAF, Royal Thai Air Force – Thailand
RUAG, RUAG Aerospace – Switzerland
Rumpler, Edmund Rumpler – Austria, (Rumpler Flugzeugwerke GmbH)
Rupert, Charles Rupert Joses – Brazil
Ruschmeyer, Ruschmeyer Luftfahrttechnik GmbH – Germany
Rusjan Brothers, Rusjan Brothers – Austro-Hungarian Empire, (Edvard & Josiph (Jože) Rusjan)
Rutan, Rutan Aircraft Factory – United States, (Scaled Composites)
RWD, Rogalski, Wigura and Drzewiecki – Poland
Ryan, Ryan Aeronautical Company – United States

S
S-PLANE Automation, S-PLANE Automation (Pty) Ltd – South Africa
Saab AB, Saab AB – Sweden
Saab, Saab Aircraft AB – Sweden
Saab, Saab-Scania AB – Sweden
Saab, Svenska Aeroplan AB Saab – Sweden
Saab-Fairchild, see SAAB and FAIRCHILD – Sweden/United States
SAASA, Servicios Aéreas de America SA – Mexico
 Sabrina Aircraft Manufacturing – United States 
SABCA, Société Anonyme Belge de Constructions Aéronautiques – Belgium
Sadler, Sadler Aircraft Corporation – United States
SAI (1), Skandinavisk Aero Industri AS – Denmark
SAI (2), SAI Società Aeronautica Italiana srl – Italy
Sailplane Corporation of America – United States
Saint Germain, Centre de Recherches Jean Saint Germain, Inc. – Canada
Salvay-Stark, M. E. Salvay and George Stark – United States
Samolot, Poland
Samsung, Samsung Aerospace Industries Ltd – South Korea, (SSA) > Korea Aerospace Industries
SAN, Société Aéronautique Normande – France
Sanderson, Sanderson Machine Corporation – United States
Sands, Ron Sands Company – United States
Sargent-Fletcher, Sargent-Fletcher Company – United States
SATIC, Special Aircraft Transport International Company – France/Germany
SAU, Nauchno-Proizvodstvennaya Korporatsiya Samoloty-Amfibyi Universalnyye – Russia
Saunders Aircraft, Saunders Aircraft Corporation – Canada
Saunders-Roe, Saunders-Roe Limited – United Kingdom
Sauper, Sauper Aviation SA – France
Sauser, Sauser Aircraft Company – United States
Savoia-Marchetti, Savoia-Marchetti – Italy, (1915–1951 & 1953–1983)
Scaled, Scaled Composites, Inc. – United States
Scaled Aviation Industries (Private) Limited, Scaled Aviation Industries (Private) Limited – Pakistan
SCAN, Société des Constructions Aéro-Navales – France
SCANOR, Société de Construction Aéronautique du Nord – France
Scenic, Scenic Aviation Services – United States
Schafer, Schafer Aircraft Modifications, Inc. – United States
Scheibe, Scheibe Flugzeugbau GmbH – Germany
Schempp-Hirth, Schempp-Hirth Flugzeugbau GmbH – Germany
Schempp-Hirth, Schempp-Hirth GmbH – Germany
Schempp-Hirth, Schempp-Hirth GmbH & Companie KG – Germany
Schempp-Hirth, Schempp-Hirth OHG – Germany
Schleicher, Alexander Schleicher GmbH & Co – Germany
Schleicher, Alexander Schleicher Segelflugzeugbau – Germany
Schneider, Edmund Schneider – Germany, Australia
Schweizer, Schweizer Aircraft Corporation – United States
Scintex, Scintex Aviation SA – France
Scottish Aviation, Scottish Aviation, Ltd. – United Kingdom, (?-1977) > British Aerospace
SC Paragliding, Kharkiv, Ukraine
SCWAL, SCWAL SA – Belgium
SEA, Société d'Etudes Aéronautiques – France
Seabird, Seabird Aviation Australia Pty, Ltd. – Australia
Seabird, Seabird Aviation Jordan LLC – Jordan
Seastar, SeaStar Aircraft, Inc. – United States
SET, Societatea pentru exploatari technice – Romania
Seawind, Seawind, Inc. – United States
Seat Air Systems, Inc.,Seat Air Systems, Inc.,- United States
Seawind, Seawind International, Inc. – Canada
Seawind, SNA, Inc. – United States
SECM, SECM – France, (1916–1921) > Amiot
Seedwings Europe, Schlitters, Austria
SEGA Aircraft, SEGA Aircraft – Belgium
Seginus Inc, Seginus Inc – United States
Sepecat, Société Européenne de Production de l'Avion ECAT – France/United Kingdom
Sequoia, Sequoia Aircraft Corporation – United States
SEREB, SEREB – France, (1959–1970) (Ballistic Missiles Study and Manufacture Company) > Aérospatiale
Serv-Aero, Serv-Aero Engineering, Inc. – United States
Servoplant, Servoplant SRL – Romania
SETCA Société d'Études Techniques et de Constructions Aéronautiques – France
Seversky, Seversky Aircraft Corporation – United States, > Republic Aviation Company
SF, Swiss Aircraft and Systems Enterprise Corporation – Switzerland
SFECMAS, Societe Francaise d'Etudes et de Constructions de Materials – France, (1953–1955) (Société Française d'Etude et de Construction de Matériels Aéronautiques Spéciaux – French Company for the study and construction of special aeronautical materials) > SNCAN
SFERMA, Société Française d'Entretien et de Reparation de Matériel Aéronautique – France, (Maintenance and Aeronautical Material Repairs Company of France)
SG Aviation, SG Aviation – Italy
SGAU, Samarsky Gosudartvennyi Aerokosmitsesky Universitet – Russia
Shaanxi, Shaanxi Aircraft Company – China
Shaanxi, Shaanxi Transport Aircraft Factory – China
Shadin, Shadin LP – United States
Shanghai, Shanghai Aircraft Manufacturing Factory – China
Shanghai, Shanghai Aviation Industrial Corporation – China
Shanghai Sikorsky, Shanghai Sikorsky Aircraft Company, Ltd. – China
Shenyang, Shenyang Aircraft Corporation – China
Shenyang, Shenyang Aircraft Factory – China
Shenyang Sailplane, Shenyang Sailplane and Lightplane Factory – China
Shenyang Sailplane, Shenyang Sailplane Factory – China
Sherpa, Sherpa Aircraft Manufacturing Company – United States
Shijiazhuang, Shijiazhuang Aircraft Manufacturing Corporation – China
Shijiazhuang, Shijiazhuang Aircraft Plant – China
Shin Meiwa, Shin Meiwa Industry Company, Ltd. – Japan
Shin Meiwa, ShinMaywa Industries, Ltd. – Japan
Shin Meiwa, ShinMaywa Kogyo KK – Japan
Shinn, Shinn Engineering, Inc. – United States
Short, Short Brothers & Harland, Ltd. – United Kingdom, (?-1989) > Bombardier Aerospace
Short, Short Brothers, Ltd. – United Kingdom
Short, Short Brothers PLC – United Kingdom
Showa, Showa Aircraft Industry Co., Ltd. – Japan
Showers-Aero, Milton, Pennsylvania, United States
SIAI-Marchetti, SIAI-Marchetti SpA – Italy
SIAT, Siebelwerke-ATG GmbH – Germany
Siddeley-Deasy, Siddeley-Deasy Motor Car Co., Ltd.. – United Kingdom, > Armstrong Siddeley
Siebel, Siebel-Flugzeugwerke AG – Germany, (1955–1970) (Siebel Aircraft Factory) > MBB
Siemens-Schuckert, Siemens-Schuckertwerke – Germany
Sikorsky, Sikorsky Aircraft Division of United Aircraft Corporation – United States
Sikorsky, Sikorsky Aircraft Division of United Technologies Corporation – United States
Silhouette, Silhouette Aircraft, Inc. – United States
Silvaire, Silvaire Aircraft Company – United States
Silvercraft, Silvercraft SpA – Italy
Sindlinger, Fred G. Sindlinger – United States
Singapore, Singapore Aerospace, Ltd. – Singapore
Singapore, Singapore Aircraft Industries Pte, Ltd. – Singapore
Singapore, Singapore Technologies Aerospace, Ltd. – Singapore
Sino Swearingen Aircraft Corporation – United States/China-Taiwan
SIPA, Société Industrielle pour l'Aéronautique – France
Siravia, Siravia SA – France
Sisler, Sisler Aircraft Company – United States
SITAR, Sociètè Industrielle de Tolerie pour l'Aéronautique et Matériel Roulant – France
Sivel, Sivel Srl – Italy
Skif Paragliding, Feodosia, Ukraine
Skliar, Bill Skliar – United States
Skycraft, Skycraft International, Inc. – United States
Skydancer, SkyDancer Aviation – United States
Skyfox, Skyfox Aviation, Ltd. – Australia
Skygear, Korean Light Aircraft Corporation – South Korea
Skyleader, Jihlava, Czech Republic
Skymaster Powered Parachutes, Hartland, Wisconsin, United States
Skyote Aeromarine, Skyote Aeromarine, Ltd. – United States
Sky Paragliders, Frýdlant nad Ostravicí, Czech Republic
Skyrider Flugschule – Germany
Skyrunner Paramotor Laboratory, Pskov, Russia
Sky Science, Tidworth, United Kingdom
Skystar, Skystar Aircraft Corporation – United States
Skywalk GmbH & Co. KG, Marquartstein, Bavaria, Germany
Skyway Products, Ettenheim, Germany
Slepcev, Slepcev Aircraft Industries – Australia
Sling, Sling Aircraft - South Africa
Slingsby, Slingsby Aviation, Ltd. – United Kingdom
Slipstream, SlipStream Industries, Inc. – United States
SMAN, Société Morbihannaise d'Aéro Navigation – France
SME, SME Aviation Sdn Bhd – Malaysia
Smith (1), Frank W. Smith – United States
Smith (2), Wilbur L. Smith – United States
Smith (3), Barry Smith – United Kingdom
Smyth, Jerry Smyth – United States
SNCA, Société Nationale de Constructions Aéronautiques – France
SNCAC, Société Nationale de Constructions Aéronautiques du Centre – France, (1936–1949) (SNCAC) (Aérocentre) > SNCAN, SNCASO, SNECMA
SNCAN, Société Nationale de Construction Aéronautique du Nord – France
SNCAO, Société Nationale des Constructions Aéronautiques de l'Ouest – France
SNCASO – France
SNECMA, Société Nationale d'Étude et de Construction de Moteurs d'Aviation – France, (1956–1959) (National Company for the Study and Construction of Aviation Engines)
Snobird, SnoBird, Inc. – United States
Snow, Snow Aeronautical Company – United States
Snow, Snow Aeronautical Corporation – United States
Soaring Concepts, Sturgis, Michigan, United States
Société Nouvelle d'Aviation Sportive (Stryke-Air), Noillac, France
SOCA, Société de l'Ouest de Construction Aéronautique – France
SOCATA, Socata Group Aerospatiale – France
SOCATA, Socata Group Aerospatiale Matra – France
SOCATA, Société de Construction d'Avions de Tourisme et d'Affaires – France
Soko, Preduzece Soko – Bosnia-Hercegovina
Soko, Soko Air Mostar – Bosnia-Hercegovina
Soko, Soko Metalopreradijavacka Industrija sa Organicenom Solidarnom Odgovornoscu Oour-A Oour Fabrika Vazduhoplova – Bosnia-Hercegovina
Soko, Soko Vazduhoplovna Industrija Radna Organizacija Vazduhoplovstvo – Bosnia-Hercegovina
Soko, Sour Vazduhoplovna Industrija Soko – Bosnia-Hercegovina
Soko, Vazduhoplovna Industrija Soko DD – Bosnia-Hercegovina
Soko-Cniar, see SOKO and CNIAR – Bosnia-Hercegovina/Romania
Sokopf, Innsbruck, Austria
Solar Turbines – Solar Aircraft Company – United States
Solar Wings, United Kingdom
Solid Air UL-Bau Franz –  Hundheim, Rheinland-Pfalz, Germany
Solo Wings, Gillitts, KwaZulu-Natal, South Africa
Soloy, Soloy Conversions, Ltd. – United States
Sol Paragliders, Jaraguá do Sul, Brazil
Sonex, Sonex, Ltd. – United States
Sopwith, The Sopwith Aviation Company, Ltd. – United Kingdom
Sorrell Aviation, C. Hobart Sorrell, Tenino, Washington, United States
Sorrell, Sorrell Aviation – United States
SPAD, Société Pour L'Aviation et ses Dérivés – France, (1910–1914) (1914-Post war) (Originally Société Pour les Appareils Deperdussin) > Blériot-SPAD
Southern Powered Parachutes, Nicholson, Georgia, United States, (formerly called Condor Powered Parachutes)
Spartan, Spartan Aircraft Company – United States
Spartan Aircraft Ltd, United Kingdom
Spartan Microlights, Astoria, New York, United States
Specter Aircraft, Bancroft, Idaho, United States
Spectrum Aeronautical – United States
Spectrum Aircraft – (1983–1992) – Canada
Speedtwin, Speedtwin Developments, Ltd. – United Kingdom
Spencer, P. H. Spencer – United States
Spencer, Spencer Amphibian Aircraft, Inc. – United States
Sperwill Ltd, Bristol, United Kingdom
Spezio, Tony and Dorothy Spezio – United States
Spitfire, Spitfire Helicopter Company, Ltd. – United States
Spirit, Spirit AeroSystems, Inc. – United States
Sport 2000, Capena, Italy
Sport Racer, Sport Racer, Inc. – United States
Sportavia-Putzer, Sportavia-Pützer GmbH u. Co. KG – Germany
Spratt, George G. Spratt – United States
Spring, W. Spring – Canada
SSH, Serwis Samolotow Historycznich – Poland
St. Croix, St. Croix Aircraft – United States
St. Just, St. Just Aviation, Inc. – Canada
Stampe, Stampe & Renard – Belgium
Stampe, Stampe & Vertongen – Belgium
Standard Aircraft Corporation, Standard Aircraft Corporation – United States
Standard Motors, Standard Motor Company – United Kingdom
Starck, André Starck – France
Starfire, Starfire Aviation, Inc. – United States
Stargate, Inc, McMinnville, Oregon, United States
Stark, Stark Flugzeugbau KG – Germany
Stark, Stark Iberica SA – Spain
Starkraft, Starkraft – United States
Stark-Trefethen, George Stark and Al Trefethen – United States
Star-Lite, Star-Lite Aircraft – United States
Starpac, Star of Phoenix Aircraft – United States
Statler, William H. Statler – United States
Staudacher, Staudacher Aircraft, Inc. – United States
Stearman, Stearman Aircraft Company – United States, (1927–1939) > Boeing
Steen, Lamar Steen – United States
Stemme, Stemme Gmbh & Co KG – Germany
Stephens, C. L. Stephens – United States
Stern, René Stern – France
Stern-Mallick, René Stern et Richard Mallick – France
Stewart Aircraft Corporation, Stewart Aircraft Corporation – United States
Donald Stewart, Donald Stewart – United States
W.F. Stewart Company, Flint, Michigan, United States
Stinson, Stinson Aircraft Corporation – United States
Stinson, Stinson Division of Consolidated Vultee Corporation – United States
Stits, Stits Aircraft – United States
Stoddard-Hamilton, Stoddard-Hamilton Aircraft, Inc. – United States
Stolp, Louis A. Stolp – United States
Storch Aviation, Storch Aviation Australia Pty, Ltd. – Australia
 Storm Aircraft, also called the StormAircraft Group, Sabaudia, Italy
Stout, Stout Metal Airplane Company – United States
Stratos Aircraft, Redmond, Oregon, United States
Streamline Welding, Streamline Welding, Inc. – Canada
Striplin, Striplin Aircraft Corporation – United States
Strojnik, Prof. Alex Strojnik – United States
Stroukoff, Stroukoff Aircraft Corp. – United States
SUD, Sud-Aviation, Société Nationale de Constructions Aéronautiques – France, (1957–1970) > Aérospatiale
Sud-Est, Société Nationale de Constructions Aéronautiques du Sud-Est – France, (?-1957) (SNCASE) > Sud-Aviation
Sud-Est, Sud-Est Aviation – France
Sudflug, Flugzeug-Union-Süd – Germany
Sud-Ouest, Ouest-Aviation – France, (1936–1957) (SNCASO) > Sud-Aviation
Sud-Ouest, Société Nationale de Constructions Aéronautiques du Sud-Ouest – France
Sukhoi, Gosudarstvennoye Unitarnoye Predpriyatie Aviatsionnyi Voyenno-Promyshlennyi Komplex Sukhoi – Russia, (1939–present)
Sukhoi, Opytnyi Konstruktorskoye Buro Sukhogo AOOT – Russia
Sukhoi, Sukhoi OKB – Russia
Summit, Summit Aviation, Inc. – United States
Sun Lake, Sun Lake Aircraft – United States
Sunderland, Sunderland Aircraft – United States
Sundog Powerchutes Inc, Pierceland, Saskatchewan, Canada
Sun Flightcraft (Hofbauer GmbH), Innsbruck, Austria
Supapup, Supapup Aircraft, Division of Teknico Pty, Ltd. – Australia
Super-Chipmunk, Super-Chipmunk, Inc. – Canada
Supermarine, Supermarine Aviation Works (Vickers), Ltd. – United Kingdom
Supermarine, Vickers-Armstrongs (Aircraft), Ltd. (Supermarine Division) – United Kingdom
Supermarine, Vickers-Armstrongs, Ltd. (Aircraft Section) (Supermarine Division) – United Kingdom
Supermarine Aircraft, Supermarine Aircraft PL – Australia
 Suresnes – see Ateliers Aéronautiques de Suresnes
Svenska Aero, Svenska Aero – Sweden
Swallow, Swallow Airplane Company – United States
Swearingen, Swearingen Aircraft – United States
Swearingen, Swearingen Aircraft Corporation – United States
Swearingen, Swearingen Aircraft, Inc. – United States
Swearingen, Swearingen Aviation Corporation – United States
Swearingen, Swearingen Engineering and Technology, Inc. – United States
Swift Aircraft – Swift Aircraft, Norwich – United Kingdom
Swing Flugsportgeräte, Landsberied, Germany
Swing-Europe, Ebringen, Germany
Symphony Aircraft Industries – Trois-Rivieres, Quebec, Canada
Synairgie, Synairgie – France
SZD, Przedsiebiorstwo Doswiadczalno Produkcyjne Szybownictwa-Panstwowe Zaklady Lotnice Bielsko – Poland
SZD, Szybowcowy Zaklad Doswiadczalny – Poland

See also
 Aircraft
 List of aircraft engine manufacturers
 List of aircraft manufacturers

Q